Taraza is a town and municipality in the Bajo Cauca subregion of Antioquia Department, Colombia. The municipality was separated from the municipality of Cáceres in 1979.

In April 2008, 24 people were arrested, 40 were injured and at least one was killed in farmers' protests, instigated by FARC, against the eradication of the coca crop in the local area.  In the aftermath of this, the municipality declared a humanitarian crisis.

Climate
Tarazá has a tropical rainforest climate (Af) with heavy to very heavy rainfall year-round.

References

Municipalities of Antioquia Department